A backyard, or back yard (known in the United Kingdom as a back garden or just garden), is a yard at the back of a house, common in suburban developments in the Western world.

In Australia, until the mid-20th century, the back yard of a property would traditionally contain a fowl run, outhouse ("dunny"), vegetable patch, and woodheap. More recently, these have been replaced by outdoor entertainments such as a barbecue and swimming pool. But, since the 1990s, the trend in Australian suburban development has been for back yards to disappear as the dwellings now occupy almost all of the building plot.

In higher latitudes, it is economical in low land value regions to use open land surrounding a house for vegetable gardening during summers and allow sunlight to enter house windows from a low horizon angle during winters.  As land value increases, houses are built nearer to each other. In order to preserve some of the open land, house owners may choose to allow construction on the side land of their houses, but not build in front of or behind their house in order to preserve some remnants of open surrounding land.  The back area is known as the backyard or back garden.

Contents

Depending on the size of the backyard, it may have any number of items (or none), such as:

Gallery

See also
 America's Backyard
 Backyard breeder
 Backyard compost
 Backyard chickens
 Backyard furnace
 Backyard pond
 Front yard
 Yard (land)

References

External links 
 

Home